Iris fernaldii, commonly known as Fernald's iris, is a species of iris endemic to western Northern California.
It is native to the Inner and Outer North California Coast Ranges, such as the Santa Cruz Mountains, and surrounding the San Francisco Bay Area. It grows in full sun near the coast, and afternoon shade inland.

Fernald's are no longer found in pure form in Marin County, however; they have naturally hybridized with Douglas iris in this area.

Description

Iris fernaldii spreads by underground rhizomes. It has leaves that are gray-green with pink, red, or purple coloring along their edges and bases.

The gray-veined yellow flowers usually grow paired on a stem. The color ranges from creamy white or a rich to pale yellow, and rarely light lavender.

Cultivation
Iris fernaldii is cultivated as an ornamental plant by specialty plant nurseries. It is used in traditional flower beds, native plant and habitat gardens, drought tolerant and natural landscaping, and for habitat restoration projects. Occasional summer irrigation is needed in warmer climates.

See also
List of California native plants
Endemic flora of California

References

External links

CalFlora Database: Iris fernaldii (Fernald's iris)
Jepson Manual eFlora (TJM2) treatment of Iris fernaldii
USDA Plants Profile for Iris fernaldii (Fernald's iris)
Flora of North America
U.C. Photos Gallery — Iris fernaldii (Fernald's iris)
http://www.pacificcoastiris.org/spcni_photojournals/pj_marinsantacruziris.html Marin and Santa Cruz Iris hybrids

fernaldii
Endemic flora of California
Natural history of the California chaparral and woodlands
Natural history of the California Coast Ranges
Garden plants of North America
Flora without expected TNC conservation status